Trebaruna, also Treborunnis and possibly *Trebarunu, was a Lusitanian deity, probably a goddess. Trebaruna's cult was located in the cultural area of Gallaecia and Lusitania (in the territory of modern Galicia (Spain) and Portugal).

Names
Her name also appears as Trebarune, Trebaronna, Trebarone, Trebaronne and Trebaroni.

Spanish historian  also lists the following name attestations for the deity:

 Trebarona (Coria)
 Trebarune (Findão)
 Trebaroune (Lardosa)
 Trebarouna (Idanha-a-Nova)
 Triborunni (Cascais)
 Debaroni muceaicaeco (Aveledas)

Etymology
Her name could be derived from the Celtic * ('home') and * ('secret, mystery'). Spanish philologist Antonio Tovar suggested that, like the first part of name Trebopala, this goddess could have been connected to the community. Jürgen Untermann states that the names of this deity are found in the dative case, suggesting a nominative form like *Trebaru or *Trebaro.

Epigraphic evidence
Tovar listed three inscriptions wherein their name is attested: one from Idanha-a-Velha, a second from Coria and the third from Lardosa.

Two small altars dedicated to this goddess were found in Portugal, one in Roman-Lusitanian Egitania (current Idanha-a-Velha) and another in Lardosa. The Tavares Proença Regional Museum in Castelo Branco now contains the altar from Lardosa. It was located in an area where the people from a Castro settlement founded a Roman-Lusitanian villa. This altar used to hold a statue of the goddess which has since been lost. Nevertheless, it still preserves this inscription:
 which translates as: Oconus, son of Oco, has fulfilled the vow to Trebaruna.

A name Trebarune (probably in the dative case) also appears on the inscription of Cabeço das Fráguas as a divinity receiving a sacrifice of a sheep.

In an inscription from Lusitanie, a deity Trebarune is invoked by a Toncius Toncetani:

Ara(m) pos(uit) Toncius Toncetani f(ilius) Icaedit(anus) milis Trebarun(a)e l(ibens) m(erito) v(otum) s(olvit)

José d'Encarnação lists an inscription from the Roman villa of Freiria (Cascais) (found on August 27, 1985), where a Triborunnis is invoked - a possible reference to this deity. The component Tribo- he interprets as cognate to PIE *treb-.

A more recent inscription from Capera is a dedicatory epigraphy by a person named Marcus Fidius to Augusta Trebaruna.

Possible role
José Leite de Vasconcellos suggested that Trebaruna was a war goddess, since he found a second votive altar by the same person (Toncius Toncetami), dedicated to Roman goddess Victoria.

Based on a possible etymology of her name, it seems she was a protector or protectress of property, home, and families. In the same vein, Olivares Pedreños cited positions by d'Arbois de Jubainville and Lambrino that interpret her as a protectress of the group or tribe.

Legacy
Following the announcement in 1895 by José Leite de Vasconcelos of the discovery of Trebaruna as a new theonym, a poem celebrating this was published which  likened Trebaruna to the Roman Victoria. She has recently become, among neopagans, a goddess of battles and alliances.
The Portuguese metal-band Moonspell composed a song called "Trebaruna" which is a celebration of the goddess.

See also

List of Lusitanian deities
Lusitanian mythology

References

Bibliography
 .
 .

Further reading
 Encarnação, José d' (2021). "Trebaruna, divindade lusitana intemporal". In: Materiaes nº. 5. pp. 37–76. .
 Lambrino, Scarlat. La déesse celtique Trebaruna. Bulletin des études portugaises, tome XX. [Lisboa]: Bertrand, 1957. 23p (monograph)

External links

Lusitanian goddesses
Tutelary deities